Alex Michael Erickson (born November 6, 1992) is an American football wide receiver and return specialist for the Washington Commanders of the National Football League (NFL). He played college football at Wisconsin and was signed by the Cincinnati Bengals as an undrafted free agent in 2016. He has also been a member of the Carolina Panthers.

High school career
At Darlington High School, Erickson rushed for 3,856 yards and 57 touchdowns, passed for 3,648 yards and 37 touchdowns and recorded 170 tackles and 14 interceptions. He was chosen to play in the WFCA All-Star game as a senior and was named the Wisconsin State Journal Small School Player of the Year. He was first-team all-state as defensive back and first-team all-conference as defensive back and quarterback after gaining 2,489 yards of total offense (1,239 rushing and 1,250 passing), scoring 33 touchdowns (20 rushing and 13 passing) and making 50 tackles with three interceptions.

College career

Erickson lettered three years at Wisconsin, finishing his career ranked 10th in school history with 1,877 receiving yards and ranked sixth all-time with 141 career receptions. In the 2013 season, he had nine receptions for 127 receiving yards in seven games. The next season, his role in the offense expanded with 55 receptions for 772 receiving yards and three receiving touchdowns in 13 games. For his senior season, he caught 77 passes (second in school history) for 978 receiving yards and three receiving touchdowns and he was named first-team All-Big Ten (media), second-team All-Big Ten (coaches), and Academic All-Big Ten (for the third consecutive year).

Professional career

Cincinnati Bengals
Erickson signed with the Cincinnati Bengals as an undrafted free agent in 2016. He was the only undrafted free agent to make the Bengals' final roster.

He started the season as the team's primary kick returner and punt returner, a spot he continued throughout the season, and as a backup receiver. For the season, he had 6 catches for 71 yards, and averaged 27.9 yards per kickoff return and 7.0 yards per punt return.  His 810 kickoff return yards led the NFL in that category.

On November 19, 2017, Erickson recorded his first NFL touchdown, scoring on a 29-yard pass from Andy Dalton during the Bengals 20–17 victory over the Denver Broncos. Overall, he finished the 2017 season with 12 receptions for 180 receiving yards and a receiving touchdown to go along with 32 kick returns for 663 net yards and 39 punt returns for 278 net yards.

On September 8, 2018, Erickson signed a two-year contract extension with the Bengals through the 2020 season. He finished the 2018 season with 20 receptions for 187 yards.

Erickson posted his first career 100+ receiving yard game on October 20, 2019, against the Jacksonville Jaguars, where he finished with 137 receiving yards as the Bengals lost 17-27. Overall, Erickson finished the 2019 season with 43 receptions for 529 receiving yards.

Houston Texans
Erickson signed with the Houston Texans on March 30, 2021. He was released on August 31, 2021.

Carolina Panthers
Erickson signed with the Carolina Panthers' practice squad on September 6, 2021, signing to their active roster a week later.

Washington Commanders
Erickson signed with the Washington Commanders on May 4, 2022. He was waived on August 30, 2022, and signed to the practice squad the next day.
He signed a reserve/future contract on January 9, 2023.

Personal life
He married in 2017. Erickson graduated from Wisconsin in December 2015 with bachelor's degree in agricultural business management.

References

External links

 Washington Commanders bio
 Wisconsin Badgers bio

1992 births
Living people
People from Darlington, Wisconsin
Players of American football from Wisconsin
American football wide receivers
American football return specialists
Wisconsin Badgers football players
Cincinnati Bengals players
Houston Texans players
Carolina Panthers players
Washington Commanders players